Norman Butler (6 May 1930 – 1 April 2007) was an English cricketer. He was a left-handed batsman who played for Buckinghamshire. He was born in Chippenham and died in Slough.

Butler, the opening order, scored 5 runs in his only List A appearance.

External links
Norman Butler at Cricket Archive 

1930 births
2007 deaths
English cricketers
Buckinghamshire cricketers
People from Chippenham